Kingsport is a small seaside village located in Kings County, Nova Scotia, Canada, on the shores of the Minas Basin. It was famous at one time for building some of the largest wooden ships ever built in Canada.

Geography

Kingsport is located just northeast of the mouth of the Habitant River, on the west side of Minas Basin, a few miles east of Canning at the eastern end of Route 221. It is bordered by a tidal marsh to the west and sandy beaches to the south and east. Red sedimentary cliffs carved by continuous erosion rise from the beaches to the east. The dramatic 12 metre tides produce very large sand and mud flats at low tide. The village is surrounded by large expanses of fertile farmland.

An earlier name was Indian Point, later changed to Oak Point due to the number of oak trees that grew along the bank of the south side of the lower road, leading to the wharf.  The name was finally changed to Kingsport in the 1870s, as it became the major port in Kings County.

Early history
As indicated by the name Indian Point, Kingsport is believed to have once been a summer settlement of the Mi'kmaq. It was also part of the Acadian farming community which stretched along the Habitant River.  After the expulsion of the Acadians in 1755, Kingsport was settled by New England Planters One source indicates that Indian Point is mentioned as Lot 16, second division, Cornwallis township granted to Benjamin Newcomb in 1761. Another source says that Kingsport was founded in 1761 or 1762 by Isaac Bigelow who came from Connecticut and was given a grant of land called Oak Point, now Kingsport.
Bigelow is the most favoured and Isaac’s son, Ebenezer, born in 1776, is thought to have built the first house in Kingsport.

Shipbuilding
Shipbuilding emerged as a major industry in Kingsport beginning in 1833 with the launch of schooner Emerald. "Some of the largest and finest ships ever built in Canada were designed and built by Ebenezer Cox of Kingsport," according to shipping historian Frederick William Wallace.  Starting with the schooner Diadem in 1864, Cox became the master shipbuilder for a series of partnerships which built over 30 vessels of increasing size. Most had names beginning with the letter "K" and began known as the "K Ships". The shipyard included a large mill and blacksmith and used tugboats to brings rafts of timber from the Cape Blomidon area. The Kingsport yards reached their peak in 1890 with the launch of the four-masted barque Kings County followed by the ship Canada in 1891, two of the largest wooden ships ever built in Canada. Ebenezer Cox was by 1890 regarded to have built more ships than any man in Halifax. The launch of Canada on July 6, 1891 attracted over 5,000 people from all across Western Nova Scotia, brought to Kingsport by multiple special trains on the Cornwallis Valley Railway. It was considered the biggest event in the history of Kingsport. The collapse of the wooden shipbuilding industry in Atlantic Canada in the late 19th century led to a decline in the yard. The last major launch being the barquentine Skoda on June 1, 1893, although the Kingsport shipyard refocused for a number of years on ship repair. The yard used the massive Minas Basin tides as a natural drydock into the 1920s repairing such vessels as the American Bradford C. French, the largest three masted schooner ever built. The final Kingsport-built vessel was the schooner FBG built in 1929, the last coastal schooner built in all of Nova Scotia.

The Railway

As wooden ships declined, shipbuilding investors in the Kingsport area re-invested in railways. The Cornwallis Valley Railway was built in 1890 connecting Kingsport to Kentville and the mainline of the Dominion Atlantic Railway.  Kingsport was the terminus for the eastern end of the line. The first train ran from Kingsport on December 20, 1890,

Recent years
However Kingsport remained  a popular local holiday location for cottagers and in the 1970s emerged as a bedroom community for the growing towns of Eastern Kings County. In 1977, the Kingsport Community Association was organized to improve life in Kingsport.  Social events such as pie socials and card parties were held to help bring the residents together and to raise funds to build a playground, clean up the beach and provide steps and picnic tables. In 2003, the Kingsport Community Association began reconstruction of the ruins of the wharf. The outer portions were demolished and the inner portion was rebuilt into a boardwalk, boat ramp, and floats to encourage recreational boating. The association rebuilt a former general store in 2004 as a community centre and public access point for internet use.

Popular culture
Lucy Maud Montgomery used the name Kingsport in her novel Anne of the Island as a moniker for the fictional Nova Scotia town where Anne Shirley attends Redmond College after she leaves Avonlea on Prince Edward Island. The fictional Kingsport is a larger town combining elements inspired by Halifax and Annapolis Royal, Nova Scotia.

The famous Canadian poet Bliss Carman wrote a classic poem of courage about a Kingsport schooner named Scud and her fearless twelve-year-old master. Entitled "Arnold, Master of the Scud", it featured in many Canadian poetry textbooks.

Kingsport features prominently in the book Blomidon Rose, a nostalgic look at the life and landscape of 1930s Annapolis Valley by Esther Clark Wright.

See also
 Royal eponyms in Canada

References

 A History of Kingsport, Cora Atkinson, Kingsport Community Association, 1980.

External links
 Village of Kingsport, Nova Scotia
 "Kingsport", Dominion Atlantic Railway Digital Preservation Institute, railway history of the village

Communities in Kings County, Nova Scotia